Jeshnian (also Romanized as Jeshnīān, Jeshneyān, Jeshnīyān, and Joshnīān; also known as Jushnūn) is a village in Baghestan Rural District, in the Central District of Bavanat County, Fars Province, Iran. At the 2006 census, its population was 694, in 195 families.

References 

Populated places in Bavanat County